Pristocera is a genus of cuckoo wasps in the family Bethylidae. There are about five described species in Pristocera.

Species
These five species belong to the genus Pristocera:
 Pristocera armifera b
 Pristocera depressa (Fabricius, 1804) g
 Pristocera formosana Miwa & Sonan, 1935 g
 Pristocera fraterna (Acrepyris) fraterna Evans, 1963 b
 Pristocera masii Soika, 1933 g
Data sources: i = ITIS, c = Catalogue of Life, g = GBIF, b = Bugguide.net

References

Further reading

External links

 

Parasitic wasps
Chrysidoidea